Ben Taub (1889–1982) was a philanthropist and medical benefactor in Houston, Texas. Taub ran numerous businesses and served on the boards of directors for several Texas organizations. He helped in the expansion and development of Houston entities such as the Texas Medical Center and the University of Houston. Ben Taub General Hospital, a large hospital in Houston, is named for him.

Biography

Early life
His family were Jewish immigrants from the Austro-Hungarian empire and his father Jacob Nathan Taub moved to Texas in 1882. Ben Taub's family were poor and his father used to sell newspapers to make their living. Jacob Nathan later opened a tobacco store in downtown Houston. By the time Ben, their fourth child, was born they had become relatively comfortable. Taub grew up in Houston, where he attended Welch Preparatory School. During World War I, he was a captain and served in France.

Business career
He returned to Texas and expanded the family business, later becoming a real estate developer. He chaired and operated dozens of companies throughout his life, including director, chairman and senior chairman of the board, Texas Commerce Bank; chairman of the board, McGregor Park National Bank; and director, American General Insurance Company. At one time he served on 23  boards, including president and then chairman, DePelchin Faith Home for 15 years; president, Baylor Medical Foundation; trustee, Baylor College of Medicine; president, Taub Foundation; director, Child Welfare League of America; chairman, Board of Managers, Houston Tuberculosis Hospital; founding board member, TIRR; director and life director, Texas Medical Center; Trustee, St. Thomas University (Texas); 32° Mason, Master Mason, Awarded Fifty Year Masonic Grand Lodge Award; district director, Office of Price Administration (WWII); chairman, Community Chest, United Fund, which is now United Way, and many others.

In 1936, Ben Taub donated thirty-five acres to establish a permanent campus for the University of Houston. He further persuaded the heirs of J.J. Settegast to donate seventy five acres to the campus. In 1943, he was instrumental in encouraging Baylor College of Medicine to move from Dallas to the Texas Medical Center in Houston. As chairman of the board of Jefferson Davis Hospital, he and Michael E. DeBakey made Jefferson Davis Hospital a teaching facility for Baylor College of Medicine, a relationship that continued after the creation of the Harris County Hospital District.

Taub never married and spent his time visiting patients in the county hospital. For years he helped run the DePelchin Faith Home for homeless children. He worked with the Pauline Sterne Wolf Foundation. He also worked with Charlie Massey, Harris County Commissioner for Precinct 1, on charitable endeavors. During the Great Depression, he had a chauffeur driven automobile, reportedly a Pierce-Arrow. He was a director of the Texas Medical Center, headed the United Way, gave out scholarships, and sponsored visiting medical professors. He served as chairman of the Jefferson Davis Hospital from 1935 to 1964.

Later life
When Houston's new charity hospital opened in 1963 the hospital board, in recognition of his service, named it Ben Taub General Hospital. It became renowned as one of the nation's leading major trauma centers. Ben Taub died at age ninety-two on September 9, 1982. Baylor College of Medicine opened the Ben Taub Research Center in 1986. In 1990, the Harris County Hospital District opened the new, six-story, 500+ bed Ben Taub General Hospital.

References

1889 births
1982 deaths
People from Houston
American military personnel of World War I
20th-century American philanthropists
Jewish American philanthropists
American Freemasons